Capiz's 2nd congressional district is one of the two congressional districts of the Philippines in the province of Capiz. It has been represented in the House of Representatives of the Philippines since 1916 and earlier in the Philippine Assembly from 1907 to 1916. The district consists of the municipalities of Cuartero, Dao, Dumalag, Dumarao, Ivisan, Jamindan, Mambusao, Sapian, Sigma and Tapaz. It is currently represented in the 19th Congress by Jane T. Castro of the Lakas–CMD (Lakas).

Representation history

Election results

2022

2019

2016

2013

2010

See also
Legislative districts of Capiz

References

Congressional districts of the Philippines
Politics of Capiz
1907 establishments in the Philippines
Congressional districts of Western Visayas
Constituencies established in 1907